A machine tool is a machine for handling or machining metal or other rigid materials, usually by cutting, boring, grinding, shearing, or other forms of deformations.  Machine tools employ some sort of tool that does the cutting or shaping.  All machine tools have some means of constraining the work piece and provide a guided movement of the parts of the machine. Thus, the relative movement between the workpiece and the cutting tool (which is called the toolpath) is controlled or constrained by the machine to at least some extent, rather than being entirely "offhand" or "freehand". It is a power-driven metal cutting machine which assists in managing the needed relative motion between cutting tool and the job that changes the size and shape of the job material. 

The precise definition of the term machine tool varies among users, as discussed below. While all machine tools are "machines that help people to make things", not all factory machines are machine tools.

Today machine tools are typically powered other than by the  human muscle (e.g., electrically, hydraulically, or via line shaft), used to make manufactured parts (components) in various ways that include cutting or certain other kinds of deformation.

With their inherent precision, machine tools enabled the economical production of interchangeable parts.

Nomenclature and key concepts, interrelated

Many historians of technology consider that true machine tools were born when the toolpath first became guided by the machine itself in some way, at least to some extent, so that direct, freehand human guidance of the toolpath (with hands, feet, or mouth) was no longer the only guidance used in the cutting or forming process. In this view of the definition, the term, arising at a time when all tools up till then had been hand tools, simply provided a label for "tools that were machines instead of hand tools". Early lathes, those prior to the late medieval period, and modern woodworking lathes and potter's wheels may or may not fall under this definition, depending on how one views the headstock spindle itself; but the earliest historical records of a lathe with direct mechanical control of the cutting tool's path are of a screw-cutting lathe dating to about 1483. This lathe "produced screw threads out of wood and employed a true compound slide rest".

The mechanical toolpath guidance grew out of various root concepts:
 First is the spindle concept itself, which constrains workpiece or tool movement to rotation around a fixed axis. This ancient concept predates machine tools per se; the earliest lathes and potter's wheels incorporated it for the workpiece, but the movement of the tool itself on these machines was entirely freehand.
 The machine slide (tool way), which has many forms, such as dovetail ways, box ways, or cylindrical column ways. Machine slides constrain tool or workpiece movement linearly. If a stop is added, the length of the line can also be accurately controlled. (Machine slides are essentially a subset of linear bearings, although the language used to classify these various machine elements may be defined differently by some users in some contexts, and some elements may be distinguished by contrasting with others)
 Tracing, which involves following the contours of a model or template and transferring the resulting motion to the toolpath.
 Cam operation, which is related in principle to tracing but can be a step or two removed from the traced element's matching the reproduced element's final shape. For example, several cams, no one of which directly matches the desired output shape, can actuate a complex toolpath by creating component vectors that add up to a net toolpath.
 Van Der Waals Force between like materials is high; freehand manufacture of square plates, produces only square, flat, machine tool building reference components, accurate to millionths of an inch, but of nearly no variety. The process of feature replication allows the flatness and squareness of a milling machine cross slide assembly, or the roundness, lack of taper, and squareness of the two axes of a lathe machine to be transferred to a machined work piece with accuracy and precision better than a thousandth of an inch, not as fine as millionths of an inch. As the fit between sliding parts of a made product, machine, or machine tool approaches this critical thousandth of an inch measurement, lubrication and capillary action combine to prevent Van Der Waals force from welding like metals together, extending the lubricated life of sliding parts by a factor of thousands to millions; the disaster of oil depletion in the conventional automotive engine is an accessible demonstration of the need, and in aerospace design, like-to-unlike design is used along with solid lubricants to prevent Van Der Waals welding from destroying mating surfaces. Given the modulus of elasticity of metals, the range of fit tolerances near one thousandth of an inch correlates to the relevant range of constraint between at one extreme, permanent assembly of two mating parts and at the other, a free sliding fit of those same two parts.

Abstractly programmable toolpath guidance began with mechanical solutions, such as in musical box cams and Jacquard looms. The convergence of programmable mechanical control with machine tool toolpath control was delayed many decades, in part because the programmable control methods of musical boxes and looms lacked the rigidity for machine tool toolpaths. Later, electromechanical solutions (such as servos) and soon electronic solutions (including computers) were added, leading to numerical control and computer numerical control.

When considering the difference between freehand toolpaths and machine-constrained toolpaths, the concepts of accuracy and precision, efficiency, and productivity become important in understanding why the machine-constrained option adds value.

Matter-Additive, Matter-Preserving, and Matter-Subtractive "Manufacturing" can proceed in sixteen ways: Firstly, the work may be held either in a hand, or a clamp; secondly, the tool may be held either in a hand, or a clamp; thirdly, the energy can come from either the hand(s) holding the tool and/or the work, or from some external source, including for examples a foot treadle by the same worker, or a motor, without limitation; and finally,  the control can come from either the hand(s) holding the tool and/or the work, or from some other source, including computer numerical control. With two choices for each of four parameters, the types are enumerated to sixteen types of Manufacturing, where Matter-Additive might mean painting on canvas as readily as it might mean 3D printing under computer control, Matter-Preserving might mean forging at the coal fire as readily as stamping license plates, and Matter-Subtracting might mean casually whittling a pencil point as readily as it might mean precision grinding the final form of a laser deposited turbine blade.

Humans are generally quite talented in their freehand movements; the drawings, paintings, and sculptures of artists such as Michelangelo or Leonardo da Vinci, and of countless other talented people, show that human freehand toolpath has great potential. The value that machine tools added to these human talents is in the areas of rigidity (constraining the toolpath despite thousands of newtons (pounds) of force fighting against the constraint), accuracy and precision, efficiency, and productivity. With a machine tool, toolpaths that no human muscle could constrain can be constrained; and toolpaths that are technically possible with freehand methods, but would require tremendous time and skill to execute, can instead be executed quickly and easily, even by people with little freehand talent (because the machine takes care of it). The latter aspect of machine tools is often referred to by historians of technology as "building the skill into the tool", in contrast to the toolpath-constraining skill being in the person who wields the tool. As an example, it is physically possible to make interchangeable screws, bolts, and nuts entirely with freehand toolpaths. But it is economically practical to make them only with machine tools.

In the 1930s, the U.S. National Bureau of Economic Research (NBER) referenced the definition of a machine tool as "any machine operating by other than hand power which employs a tool to work on metal".

The narrowest colloquial sense of the term reserves it only for machines that perform metal cutting—in other words, the many kinds of [conventional] machining and grinding. These processes are a type of deformation that produces swarf. However, economists use a slightly broader sense that also includes metal deformation of other types that squeeze the metal into shape without cutting off swarf, such as rolling, stamping with dies, shearing, swaging, riveting, and others. Thus presses are usually included in the economic definition of machine tools. For example, this is the breadth of definition used by Max Holland in his history of Burgmaster and Houdaille, which is also a history of the machine tool industry in general from the 1940s through the 1980s; he was reflecting the sense of the term used by Houdaille itself and other firms in the industry. Many reports on machine tool export and import and similar economic topics use this broader definition.

The colloquial sense implying [conventional] metal cutting is also growing obsolete because of changing technology over the decades. The many more recently developed processes labeled "machining", such as electrical discharge machining, electrochemical machining, electron beam machining, photochemical machining, and ultrasonic machining, or even plasma cutting and water jet cutting, are often performed by machines that could most logically be called machine tools. In addition, some of the newly developed additive manufacturing processes, which are not about cutting away material but rather about adding it, are done by machines that are likely to end up labeled, in some cases, as machine tools. In fact, machine tool builders are already developing machines that include both subtractive and additive manufacturing in one work envelope, and retrofits of existing machines are underway.

The natural language use of the terms varies, with subtle connotative boundaries. Many speakers resist using the term "machine tool" to refer to woodworking machinery (joiners, table saws, routing stations, and so on), but it is difficult to maintain any true logical dividing line, and therefore many speakers accept a broad definition. It is common to hear machinists refer to their machine tools simply as "machines". Usually the mass noun "machinery" encompasses them, but sometimes it is used to imply only those machines that are being excluded from the definition of "machine tool". This is why the machines in a food-processing plant, such as conveyors, mixers, vessels, dividers, and so on, may be labeled "machinery", while the machines in the factory's tool and die department are instead called "machine tools" in contradistinction.

Regarding the 1930s NBER definition quoted above, one could argue that its specificity to metal is obsolete, as it is quite common today for particular lathes, milling machines, and machining centers (definitely machine tools) to work exclusively on plastic cutting jobs throughout their whole working lifespan. Thus the NBER definition above could be expanded to say "which employs a tool to work on metal or other materials of high hardness". And its specificity to "operating by other than hand power" is also problematic, as machine tools can be powered by people if appropriately set up, such as with a treadle (for a lathe) or a hand lever (for a shaper). Hand-powered shapers are clearly "the 'same thing' as shapers with electric motors except smaller", and it is trivial to power a micro lathe with a hand-cranked belt pulley instead of an electric motor. Thus one can question whether power source is truly a key distinguishing concept; but for economics purposes, the NBER's definition made sense, because most of the commercial value of the existence of machine tools comes about via those that are powered by electricity, hydraulics, and so on. Such are the vagaries of natural language and controlled vocabulary, both of which have their places in the business world.

History 

Forerunners of machine tools included bow drills and potter's wheels, which had existed in ancient Egypt prior to 2500 BC, and lathes, known to have existed in multiple regions of Europe since at least 1000 to 500 BC. But it was not until the later Middle Ages and the Age of Enlightenment that the modern concept of a machine tool—a class of machines used as tools in the making of metal parts, and incorporating machine-guided toolpath—began to evolve. Clockmakers of the Middle Ages and renaissance men such as Leonardo da Vinci helped expand humans' technological milieu toward the preconditions for industrial machine tools. During the 18th and 19th centuries, and even in many cases in the 20th, the builders of machine tools tended to be the same people who would then use them to produce the end products (manufactured goods). However, from these roots also evolved an industry of machine tool builders as we define them today, meaning people who specialize in building machine tools for sale to others.

Historians of machine tools often focus on a handful of major industries that most spurred machine tool development. In order of historical emergence, they have been firearms (small arms and artillery); clocks; textile machinery; steam engines (stationary, marine, rail, and otherwise) (the story of how Watt's need for an accurate cylinder spurred Boulton's boring machine is discussed by Roe); sewing machines; bicycles; automobiles; and aircraft. Others could be included in this list as well, but they tend to be connected with the root causes already listed. For example, rolling-element bearings are an industry of themselves, but this industry's main drivers of development were the vehicles already listed—trains, bicycles, automobiles, and aircraft; and other industries, such as tractors, farm implements, and tanks, borrowed heavily from those same parent industries.

Machine tools filled a need created by textile machinery during the Industrial Revolution in England in the middle to late 1700s.  Until that time, machinery was made mostly from wood, often including gearing and shafts.  The increase in mechanization required more metal parts, which were usually made of cast iron or wrought iron.  Cast iron could be cast in molds for larger parts, such as engine cylinders and gears, but was difficult to work with a file and could not be hammered.  Red hot wrought iron could be hammered into shapes.  Room temperature wrought iron was worked with a file and chisel and could be made into gears and other complex parts; however, hand working lacked precision and was a slow and expensive process.

James Watt was unable to have an accurately bored cylinder for his first steam engine, trying for several years until John Wilkinson invented a suitable boring machine in 1774, boring Boulton & Watt's first commercial engine in 1776.

The advance in the accuracy of machine tools can be traced to Henry Maudslay and refined by Joseph Whitworth. That Maudslay had established the manufacture and use of master plane gages in his shop (Maudslay & Field) located on Westminster Road south of the Thames River in London about 1809, was attested to by James Nasmyth who was employed by Maudslay in 1829 and Nasmyth documented their use in his autobiography.

The process by which the master plane gages were produced dates back to antiquity but was refined to an unprecedented degree in the Maudslay shop. The process begins with three square plates each given an identification (ex., 1,2 and 3). The first step is to rub plates 1 and 2 together with a marking medium (called bluing today) revealing the high spots which would be removed by hand scraping with a steel scraper, until no irregularities were visible. This would not produce true plane surfaces but a "ball and socket" concave-concave and convex-convex fit, as this mechanical fit, like two perfect planes, can slide over each other and reveal no high spots. The rubbing and marking are repeated after rotating 2 relative to 1 by 90 degrees to eliminate concave-convex "potato-chip" curvature. Next, plate number 3 is compared and scraped to conform to plate number 1 in the same two trials. In this manner plates number 2 and 3 would be identical. Next plates number 2 and 3 would be checked against each other to determine what condition existed, either both plates were "balls" or "sockets" or "chips" or a combination. These would then be scraped until no high spots existed and then compared to plate number 1. Repeating this process of comparing and scraping the three plates could produce plane surfaces accurate to within millionths of an inch (the thickness of the marking medium).

The traditional method of producing the surface gages used an abrasive powder rubbed between the plates to remove the high spots, but it was Whitworth who contributed the refinement of replacing the grinding with hand scraping. Sometime after 1825, Whitworth went to work for Maudslay and it was there that Whitworth perfected the hand scraping of master surface plane gages. In his paper presented to the British Association for the Advancement of Science at Glasgow in 1840, Whitworth pointed out the inherent inaccuracy of grinding due to no control and thus unequal distribution of the abrasive material between the plates which would produce uneven removal of material from the plates.

With the creation of master plane gages of such high accuracy, all critical components of machine tools (i.e., guiding surfaces such as machine ways) could then be compared against them and scraped to the desired accuracy.
The first machine tools offered for sale (i.e., commercially available) were constructed by Matthew Murray in England around 1800. Others, such as Henry Maudslay, James Nasmyth, and Joseph Whitworth, soon followed the path of expanding their entrepreneurship from manufactured end products and millwright work into the realm of building machine tools for sale.

Important early machine tools included the slide rest lathe, screw-cutting lathe, turret lathe, milling machine, pattern tracing lathe, shaper, and metal planer, which were all in use before 1840. With these machine tools the decades-old objective of producing interchangeable parts was finally realized. An important early example of something now taken for granted was the standardization of screw fasteners such as nuts and bolts. Before about the beginning of the 19th century, these were used in pairs, and even screws of the same machine were generally not interchangeable. Methods were developed to cut screw thread to a greater precision than that of the feed screw in the lathe being used.  This led to the bar length standards of the 19th and early 20th centuries.

American production of machine tools was a critical factor in the Allies' victory in World War II.  Production of machine tools tripled in the United States in the war.  No war was more industrialized than World War II, and it has been written that the war was won as much by machine shops as by machine guns.

The production of machine tools is concentrated in about 10 countries worldwide: China, Japan, Germany, Italy, South Korea, Taiwan, Switzerland, US, Austria, Spain and a few others. Machine tool innovation continues in several public and private research centers worldwide.

Drive power sources
“all the turning of the iron for the cotton machinery built by Mr. Slater was done with hand chisels or tools in lathes turned by cranks with hand power”.  David Wilkinson
Machine tools can be powered from a variety of sources.  Human and animal power (via cranks, treadles, treadmills, or treadwheels) were used in the past, as was water power (via water wheel); however, following the development of high-pressure steam engines in the mid 19th century, factories increasingly used steam power.  Factories also used hydraulic and pneumatic power.  Many small workshops continued to use water, human and animal power until electrification after 1900.

Today most machine tools are powered by electricity; hydraulic and pneumatic power are sometimes used, but this is uncommon.

Automatic control

Machine tools can be operated manually, or under automatic control.  Early machines used flywheels to stabilize their motion and had complex systems of gears and levers to control the machine and the piece being worked on.  Soon after World War II, the numerical control (NC) machine was developed. NC machines used a series of numbers punched on paper tape or punched cards to control their motion. In the 1960s, computers were added to give even more flexibility to the process. Such machines became known as computerized numerical control (CNC) machines. NC and CNC machines could precisely repeat sequences over and over, and could produce much more complex pieces than even the most skilled tool operators.

Before long, the machines could automatically change the specific cutting and shaping tools that were being used. For example, a drill machine might contain a magazine with a variety of drill bits for producing holes of various sizes. Previously, either machine operators would usually have to manually change the bit or move the work piece to another station to perform these different operations. The next logical step was to combine several different machine tools together, all under computer control. These are known as machining centers, and have dramatically changed the way parts are made.

Examples 
Examples of machine tools are:
 Broaching machine
 Drill press
 Gear shaper
 Hobbing machine
 Hone
 Lathe
 Screw machines
 Milling machine
 Shear (sheet metal)
 Shaper
Bandsaw Saws
 Planer
 Stewart platform mills
 Grinding machines
 Multitasking machines (MTMs)—CNC machine tools with many axes that combine turning, milling, grinding, and material handling into one highly automated machine tool

When fabricating or shaping parts, several techniques are used to remove unwanted metal.  Among these are:
 Electrical discharge machining
 Grinding (abrasive cutting)
 Multiple edge cutting tools
 Single edge cutting tools

Other techniques are used to add desired material. Devices that fabricate components by selective addition of material are called rapid prototyping machines.

Machine tool manufacturing industry 

The worldwide market for machine tools was approximately $81 billion in production in 2014 according to a survey by market research firm Gardner Research. The largest producer of machine tools was China with $23.8 billion of production followed by Germany and Japan at neck and neck with $12.9 billion and $12.88 billion respectively. South Korea and Italy rounded out the top 5 producers with revenue of $5.6 billion and $5 billion respectively.

See also

References

Bibliography
  A history most specifically of Burgmaster, which specialized in turret drills; but in telling Burgmaster's story, and that of its acquirer Houdaille, Holland provides a history of the machine tool industry in general between World War II and the 1980s that ranks with Noble's coverage of the same era (Noble 1984) as a seminal history. Later republished under the title From Industry to Alchemy: Burgmaster, a Machine Tool Company. 
 
 . The Moore family firm, the Moore Special Tool Company, independently invented the jig borer (contemporaneously with its Swiss invention), and Moore's monograph is a seminal classic of the principles of machine tool design and construction that yield the highest possible accuracy and precision in machine tools (second only to that of metrological machines). The Moore firm epitomized the art and science of the tool and die maker.
 . A seminal classic of machine tool history. Extensively cited by later works.
 
 
 . Collection of previously published monographs bound as one volume. A collection of seminal classics of machine tool history.

Further reading
  A memoir that contains quite a bit of general history of the industry.
 . A monograph with a focus on history, economics, and import and export policy. Original 1976 publication: LCCN 75-046133, .
  One of the most detailed histories of the machine tool industry from the late 18th century through 1932. Not comprehensive in terms of firm names and sales statistics (like Floud focuses on), but extremely detailed in exploring the development and spread of practicable interchangeability, and the thinking behind the intermediate steps. Extensively cited by later works.
  One of the most detailed histories of the machine tool industry from World War II through the early 1980s, relayed in the context of the social impact of evolving automation via NC and CNC.
 . A biography of a machine tool builder that also contains some general history of the industry.
 
 Ryder, Thomas and Son, Machines to Make Machines 1865 to 1968, a centenary booklet, (Derby: Bemrose & Sons, 1968)

External links 
Milestones in the History of Machine Tools

 
Industrial machinery
Machines
Machining
Tools
Woodworking